Live 1961–2000: Thirty-Nine Years of Great Concert Performances is a live compilation album by Bob Dylan, released only in Japan on February 28, 2001. It was released in March of that year in the UK.

Track listing

2001 compilation albums
2001 live albums
Bob Dylan compilation albums
Bob Dylan live albums
Sony Music compilation albums
Sony Music live albums